Sudanell is a municipality in the comarca of the Segrià in Catalonia. It is located by the junction of two rivers: the Segre and the Set. Agriculture is Sudanell's principal economic activity (peaches, apples, pears, corn). Two canals: Canal de Seròs and Acèquia de Torres irrigate the area.

Elements of touristic interest

 Cross Head (Creu del Terme). Made from stone and dated from the 14th century.
 Parish church of Sant Pere (Saint Peter). The primitive parish church of Sant Pere, Romanesque, was replaced in the 18th century for an extense Baroque building, with a monumental façade.
 The Muladar. The graves of Muladar constitute the first necropolis excavated in the region of the Segrià.
 The Official town's Holy Day is on the first weekend in October.

References

External links
Official municipal web site 
 Government data pages 

Municipalities in Segrià
Populated places in Segrià